Grigore Gheorghe Cantacuzino (1872-1930) was a Romanian Conservative politician who served as Mayor of Bucharest during 1913. The son of Gheorghe Grigore Cantacuzino and brother of Mihail G. Cantacuzino, he married Alexandrina Pallady. 

One of his sons, Alexandru Cantacuzino, became a prominent figure in Romania's fascist Legionary Movement.

Notes

1872 births
1930 deaths
Grigore Gheorghe
Mayors of Bucharest
Conservative Party (Romania, 1880–1918) politicians